Castle Creek is a stream in the U.S. state of Oregon. It is a tributary to the Rogue River.

Castle Creek was so named on account of peculiar rock formations along its course.

References

Rivers of Oregon
Rivers of Jackson County, Oregon
Rivers of Klamath County, Oregon